The Norwegian Football Federation (NFF) is the governing body of football in Norway. It was formed in 1902 and organises the men's and women's national teams, as well as the league systems for men and women (whose top levels are respectively the Eliteserien and Toppserien). The current president of NFF is Lise Klaveness. By 1 January 2004, there were 1,814 clubs organized in Norway and 373,532 registered players. It is the largest sports federation in Norway.

The NFF joined FIFA in 1908, and UEFA in 1954.

The NFF was part of an unsuccessful joint bid with the SvFF, the DBU and the SPL to host the UEFA Euro 2008 championship.  The SvFF invited the NFF to join them in bidding  for the UEFA Euro 2016 championship. The NFF and Norwegian politicians expressed support for such a proposal, but Euro 2016 was eventually awarded to France.

Foundation
In Spring 1902, Lyn invited representatives from Grane and Spring (both now defunct) to join together in forming a national football association. On 30 April, 14 delegates from the three clubs met at the Hotel Bristol in Oslo. These were Trygve Karlsen, Arthur Nordlie, Leif Eriksen and Bredo Eriksen from Lyn; Just Hagemann, Isak Benjaminsen, Walter Aigeltinger and Emil Wettergreen from Grane; and Christen Hummel Johansen, Arne Baggerud, Birger Freihow, Thorleif Wibe and Thorvald Torgersen from Spring. Together they agreed to form a football association, and voted 9 to 5 to adopt the name proposed by Lyn - Norsk Fodboldforbund. Isak Benjaminsen from Grane was adopted as the first chairman.

International honours

Men 
Olympic Bronze Medal 1936

U21 Men
European Championships Bronze Medal 1998, 2013

Women
World Cup Silver Medal 1991
World Cup Gold Medal 1995
Olympic Gold Medal 2000
European Championships Gold Medal 1987, 1993
European Championships Silver Medal 1989, 1991, 2005, 2013
European Championships Bronze Medal 2009

Regional associations
 NFF Agder
 NFF Akershus
 NFF Buskerud
 NFF Finnmark
 NFF Hordaland 
 NFF Hålogaland 
 NFF Indre Østland
 Nordland fotballkrets
 Nordmøre og Romsdal fotballkrets
 Oslo fotballkrets
 Rogaland fotballkrets
 Sogn og Fjordane fotballkrets
 Sunnmøre fotballkrets
 Telemark fotballkrets
 Troms fotballkrets
 Trøndelag fotballkrets
 Vestfold fotballkrets
 Østfold fotballkrets

Presidents

See also
Football for All in Vietnam, a 2001 project
Seasons in Norwegian football

References

External links

 Norway at FIFA site
Norway at UEFA site

Norway
Football in Norway
Futsal in Norway
Sports organisations of Norway
Football
1902 establishments in Norway
Organisations based in Oslo
Sports organizations established in 1902
Football governing bodies in Norway